The VMI Keydets basketball teams represented the Virginia Military Institute in Lexington, Virginia. The program began in 1908, and played their games out of Cormack Field House until 1981, when the construction of Cameron Hall was completed. The Keydets were members of the Southern Conference. Their primary rival is The Citadel.

1979–80

|-
|colspan=7 align=center|1980 Southern Conference men's basketball tournament

1980–81

|-
|colspan=7 align=center|1981 Southern Conference men's basketball tournament

1981–82
This was the first year in which the Keydets played in newly built Cameron Hall, which replaced aging Cormack Field House. Cameron Hall, with a capacity of 5,029, continues to serve as VMI's home today.

1982–83

1983–84

1984–85

|-
|colspan=7 align=center|1985 Southern Conference men's basketball tournament

1985–86

|-
|colspan=7 align=center|1986 Southern Conference men's basketball tournament

1986–87

|-
|colspan=7 align=center|1987 Southern Conference men's basketball tournament

1987–88

|-
|colspan=7 align=center|1988 Southern Conference men's basketball tournament

1988–89

|-
|colspan=7 align=center|1989 Southern Conference men's basketball tournament

References
 

VMI Keydets basketball seasons